= Coop Zone =

Coop Zone (Coopérative de l'Université Laval)
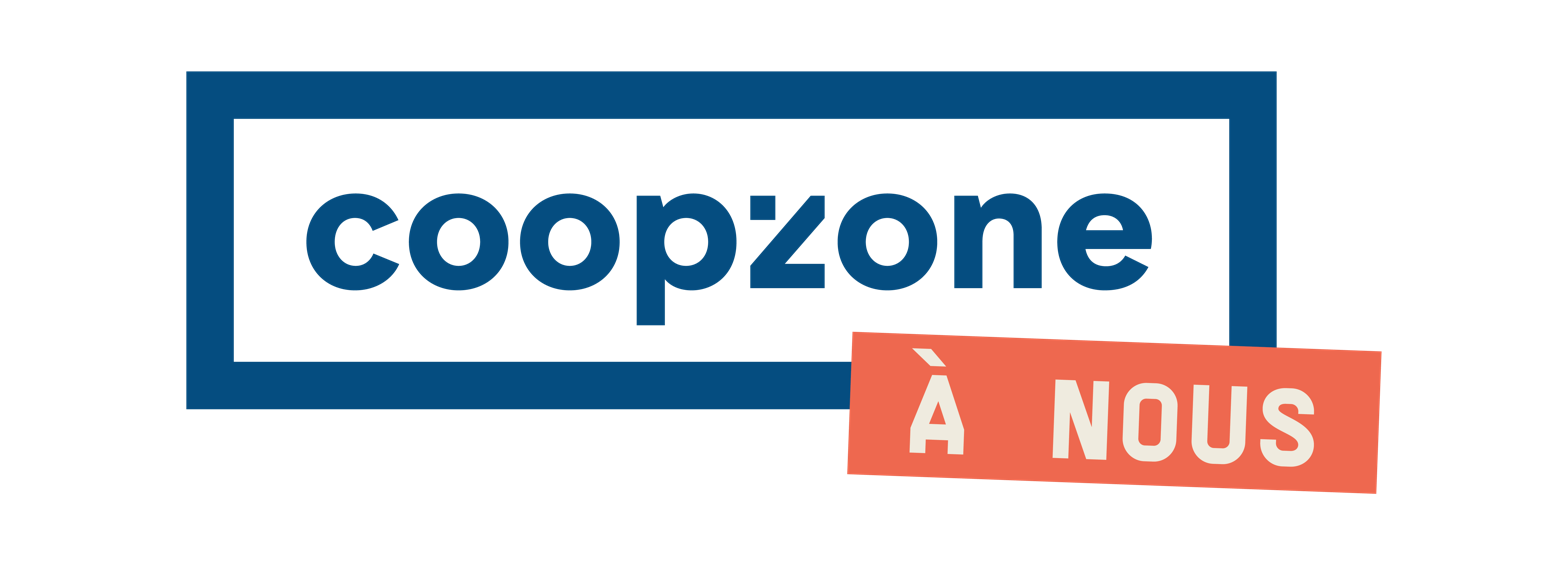
- Industry: Retail
- Genre: Consumer coopérative
- Founded: January 1987
- Headquarters: Québec, Québec (Head of office), Canada
- Key people: Éric Fong
- Products: Books, e-book, course notes, computer hardware, Apple products, art material, printing and stationery.
- Revenue: ▲50,954,502 CAD (2020-2021)
- Number of employees: 36 full-time employees and 196 part-time employees
- Website: coopzone.ca

Coopérative de l'Université Laval (often designated by its commercial diminutive "Coop Zone") is a cooperative involved in the sale of products for the community of Université Laval.

With a turnover of 50,9 million Canadian dollars and 58 442 members, it is the largest university cooperative in Quebec.

The cooperative has been recognized as number one Canadian university library by the Globe and Mail in 2007.

== History ==
The cooperative was founded in 1987 under the name "Procure coopérative de matériel étudiant". In 1996, the cooperative merged with its rival on campus "Coop Comptoir Sciences" to form the current entity.

== Stores ==
There are 4 stores:

- Maurice Pollack: cooperative general store covering all sectors
- Centre-Ville: specialized in arts
- Ferdinand-Vandry: Specialized in health sciences
- Cégep Limoilou

== Community involvement ==
The cooperative paid $509 069 in rebate for the 2020–2021 years.

== See also ==
- Université Laval
- Cooperative
